Jurabek Murodov (sometimes spelled Jurabek Muradov) is a Tajik singer and songwriter. He is a People's Artist of Tajikistan and People's Artist of USSR (1979).

Life 
Jurabek Murodov's son Jonibek Murodov is also a singer.

Track list

References

External links 
 Jurabek Murodov – Official Biography (English)

1942 births
Living people
Soviet male singers
20th-century Tajikistani male singers
21st-century Tajikistani male singers